OJSC "Baikal Airlines" was an airline based in Irkutsk, Russia. It was founded in 1991 and liquidated in 2001.

Fleet
The Baikal Airlines fleet included Antonov An-24, Antonov An-26 and Tupolev Tu-154 aircraft, as well as a leased Boeing 757 operated from 1994 to 1996.

Accidents and incidents

References

Defunct airlines of Russia
Companies based in Irkutsk
Airlines established in 1991
Former Aeroflot divisions
Airlines disestablished in 2001
1991 establishments in Russia